Garland Kirkpatrick (born 1960) is an American designer, educator, and curator based in Los Angeles.

Career
Kirkpatrick's work includes: social graphics visualizing complex socio-political issues ranging from the criminal justice system - capital punishment, mass incarceration, police brutality, and recidivism - to the environment, HIV-AIDS, homophobia, immigrant rights, and racism; and graphic design for cultural institutions, and community based organizations.

After postgraduate work at the Institute of Design in Chicago (1985-1987), he received his Master of Fine Arts in Graphic Design (1990) from Yale University where he studied under modernist design icons Paul Rand, Armin Hofmann, and Alvin Eisenman.

Kirkpatrick taught as a regular faculty in the Graphic Design program at the California Institute of the Arts (1992-2002), and served as Program Director for two years. He continues to teach design as a Professor at Loyola Marymount University, where he served as art department Chair (2011-2016).

His work is held in the permanent collections of: the American Institute of Graphic Arts Design Archives (AIGA); the Denver Art Museum, AIGA Awards Archive, Denver, CO (1991–Present); the Center for the Study of Political Graphics; the Los Angeles County Museum of Art; the Museum of Design, Zurich University of the Arts, Switzerland; the Oakland Museum of California; the Cooper-Hewitt Museum of Art, Smithsonian Institution, New York, NY (1993); Self Help Graphics & Art, Los Angeles; the Caridad Archive of Chicano Printmaking in California (CEMA), University of California, Santa Barbara; the Gerald Buck Collection, Orange County, California; the Library of Congress, Washington, DC; the Online Archives of California; the Huntington Museum, University of Texas-Austin, Austin, Texas; the Institute of Texas Cultures, University of Texas-San Antonio, San Antonio Texas; and other poster collectives including national Chicano and university archives in Arizona and New Mexico.

Kirkpatrick's graphic design work has been recognized by three national competitions of graphic design: the American Alliance of Museums' national museum publication competition, the American Center for Design (ACD) 100 show (1927-2002), and the American Institute of Graphic Arts (AIGA) Communication Graphics competition.  He received a City of Los Angeles (COLA) Individual Artist Fellowship for Design from the Department of Cultural Affairs (2003).

Garland Kirkpatrick has worked closely with the cultural communities of Los Angeles, as both art director and graphic designer through his studio, Helvetica Jones.  Selected nonprofits and cultural institutions include the Center for the Study of Political Graphics, ChangeLinks Community Newspaper, the Department of Cultural Affairs for the City of Los Angeles, the Getty Conservation Institute, and the Japanese American National Museum. He was a Director of Experience Design at Sapient corporation in San Francisco and Los Angeles (2000-2001).

Garland Kirkpatrick was recently featured along with Emory Douglas and Chaz Maviyane-Davies in Observe | Make | State: A Collection of Design Reproductions and Artifacts that Convery Issues of Social Justice (2017), an exhibition curated by Karen Gutowsky-Zimmerman at Seattle Pacific University Gallery. Recent exhibitions and workshops include Urgent Messages: Exhibition and Risographic Poster Making Workshop (2018), curated by Tuan Phan at St. Edwards University, Fine Arts Gallery in Austin, Texas.  Group exhibition and workshop featured Ashley Robin Franklin, Brandy Shigemoto, Claudia Gamundi, Edith Valle, Harsh Patel, Jesse Jaramillo, Jimmy Luu, Rene Cruz, Suthada Wadkhien, Tuan Phan, and Yewon Kwon.

Filmography

His film credits as a designer include the independent film, Fast Food Nation (2006), and the political thriller, Game (2013).

His film appearances include: Digging the Suez Canal with a Teaspoon (2019), a documentary film by David Stairs and Eric Limarenko.

Bibliography 

 Anderson, Susan, ed. GIFTED: Collecting the Art of California at Gardena High School, 1919-1956. Pasadena: Pasadena Museum of California Art in Association with Gardena High School Art Collection, Inc. and the Gardena High School Student Body, 2019. (Book Design)
 Garland Kirkpatrick, One Down: Fix the 115th House, 2017, ink and digital collage, African American Heritage Calendar & Cultural Guide, (Los Angeles Department of Cultural Affairs, January 2018), 162. (Illustration) 
 Colburn, Bolton, ed. Collecting on the Edge: The Nora Eccles Harrison Museum of Art, Utah State University. Boulder: University Press of Colorado, 2018. (Book Design)
 Dooley, Michael, “Designer Garland Kirkpatrick: Keeping Social Issues Alive,” Print Magazine, October 28, 2017 (Online Review). 
 y Montoya, Will Caperton, COLA Printed Matter, COLA 20: City of Los Angeles Individual Artist Fellowships, (Department of Cultural Affairs, Los Angeles, 2017), 78, 81, 84. (Catalogue)
 Milton Glaser, Mirco Illic, and Steven Heller, eds. The Design of Dissent: Expanded Edition: Greed, Nationalism, Alternative Facts, and the Resistance. (Beverly: Rockport Publishers, 2017), 171. (Reproduction)
 ''African American Heritage Month, Calendar and Cultural Guide'', City of Los Angeles Department of Cultural Affairs, 2017, p. 39 (Catalogue)
 Center for the Study of Political Graphics, ''Poster of the Week'': "Ban the Box," Social graphic activism on the civil rights of ex-offenders, persuading employers to remove "The box" from the hiring applications for the formerly incarcerated. November 2015.
 "Art and Art History Professor Included Among Noted Designers," Vistas, Spring 2009, p. 6
 Bohn-Spector, Claudia, "Remnants of the Real," Curator: Claudia Bohn-Spector, pp. 12, 36–39, 2009 (Catalogue)
 ''African American Heritage Month, Calendar and Cultural Guide'', City of Los Angeles Department of Cultural Affairs, 2009, p. 32 (Catalogue)
 Shirky, Clay, "In Less Than 20 Years the Internet Has Transformed...," ''What Matters: Ten Questions That Will Shape Our Future'', MsKinsey & Company, p. 117, January 2009 (Illustration)
 Lowry, Camille, "Design Journeys: Garland Kirkpatrick," American Institute of Graphic Arts (Biography:2008) 
 ''Style Wars: Dissecting the Candidate's Graphics'', National Public Radio: ''News and Views'', March 4, 2008 (Interview) 
 Gardner, Belinda, "In Geheimer PR-Mission," ArtNet Magazine, 2006 (Reproduction)
 Maya Drozdz, Outside In: An International Poster Exhibit, Lulu Publishing, 2006 (Catalogue)
 Burhart, Tara, "Art Exhibition Depicting Bush is Probed," Art Info (Associated Press), April 13, 2005 (Reproduction)
 Milton Glaser and Mirco Illic, The Design of Dissent: Socially and Politically Driven Graphics, Rockport Publishers, 2005, p. 171 (Reproduction)
 "Graphic Designing for Economic Justice," Santa Monica Daily Press, April 11, 2005, p. 3 (Quote)
 Triumph of Our Communities, Arizona State University Press, 2005, p. 102 (Reproduction)
 Axis of Evil: Perforated Prætor Naturam, Qualiatica Press, Chicago, 2004, pp. 76, 204 (Reproduction)
 Buchanan, Richard, Dennis Doordan, Victor Margolin, "Twenty Two Years of Pluralistic Discourse," ''Design Issues'': Volume 20, Number 1 Winter 2004, p. 5, Massachusetts Institute of Technology Press, (Mention) 
 Fitzgerald, Kenneth, "Bruce Mau: The Aura of Power," Design Observer, March 3, 2004 (Mention blog) 
 Cannon, Sara, ''City of Los Angeles (COLA) Individual Artist Fellowships, 2003'', City of Los Angeles Department of Cultural Affairs, pp. 41–44 (Catalogue)
 Myers, Holly, "Relationships at Play in the Physical World," Los Angeles Times, July 19, 2003 (Review) 
 Scarborough, James, "Unlikely Icons," New York Arts Magazine, September 2003 (Review) 
 LA Arts Mix, City of Los Angeles Individual Artist Fellowships, No. 11, LA City View, 2003 (Video Interview)
 We Shall Not Be Moved: Posters, Gentrification, and Resistance in the Figueroa Corridor, SAJE/CSPG/Self Help Graphics, Los Angeles, 2003, pp. 27, 35, 43 (Reproduction and interview)
 American Institute of Graphic Arts, AIGA Graphic Design, USA 20, New York, 1999, p. 176 (Reproduction)
 John Bowers, Introduction to Two Dimensional Design: Understanding Form and Function, New York, Wiley Publishers, 1999, p. 102 (Quote)
 The Picture Professional, American Society of Picture Professionals, Issue 4, 1999, p. 31 (Review)
 "What Do We Call It Now?: Graphic Design Moves With Technology," CalArts Current, Vol. 10, No. 2, 1998, p. 4 (Interview)
 Jan van Toorn, Design Beyond Design, Critical Reflection and the Practice of Visual Communication, Maastricht, Netherlands, Jan van Eyck Akademie Editions, 1998, pp. 17, 18, 182, 183 (Ministry of Information-Watts Towers Arts Center, Poster- exhibition of student works); (Second edition, Seoul Korea, 2004)
 Kirkpatrick, G. "A Noticeable Absence: Perspectives on the Multicultural in Design Education," ''Sphere'', Issue No. 2, pp. 10, 18, World Studio Foundation, New York, 1996 (Author)
 18th Annual 100 Show: American Center for Design, Chicago, 1995, p. 141 (Reproduction)
 Curtis, Cathy, "Tramp Art in Fullerton," Los Angeles Times-Orange County, January, 1993 (Review)
 Curtis, Cathy, "Writing It Down: Best Catalogue Produced by a Smaller Gallery," ''Los Angeles Times-Orange County'', January 1, 1993 (Review, mention)
 15th Annual 100 Show: American Center for Design, Chicago, 1993, p. 122 (Reproduction)
 American Institute of Graphic Arts, AIGA Graphic Design USA 14, New York, 1993, p. 141 (Reproduction)
 Carbone, Ken, "Communication Graphics Awards," Graphis Magazine, no. 278, Zurich, Switzerland, March/April, 1992, pp. 52, 53 (Reproduction)
 American Institute of Graphic Arts, AIGA Graphic Design USA 12, New York, 1991, p. 121 (Reproduction)

References

External links
 The American Institute of Graphic Arts, Design Archives
 The Center for the Study of Political Graphics
 Los Angeles County Museum of Art
 IMDb Fast Food Nation (2006)
 IMDb Game (2013)
 IMDb Garland Kirkpatrick
 Department of Cultural Affairs
 Digging the Suez Canal with a Teaspoon (2019)

1960 births
Living people
American designers
Yale University alumni
Loyola Marymount University faculty